This is an alphabetical list of notable internet service providers in Canada.

Among Canada's biggest internet service providers (ISP) are Bell, Rogers, Telus, and Shaw—with the former two being the largest in Ontario, and the latter two dominating western provinces.

List

Former ISPs 

 Craig Wireless
 Internex Online
 Look Communications
 Mountain Cablevision
 Persona Communications — acquired by Eastlink
 Rush Communications Ltd.

See also 
 Internet in Canada
 Telecommunications in Canada
 List of companies of Canada

References 

 
Internet
Internet service providers in Canada